55th Infantry Brigade may refer to:

55th Infantry Brigade (United Kingdom)
55th Infantry Brigade (United States)